The United States state of Virginia held elections in April 1815.

See also 
 Virginia's 11th congressional district special election, 1814
 Virginia's 15th congressional district special election, 1815
 United States House of Representatives elections, 1814 and 1815
 List of United States representatives from Virginia

Notes 

1815
Virginia
United States House of Representatives